Khorramdarreh (also known as Estakhr-e Derāz, Khowrmowdīyeh, and Khowrmowdūyeh) is a village in Madvarat Rural District, in the Central District of Shahr-e Babak County, Kerman Province, Iran. According to the 2006 census, its population was 13, in 6 families.

References 

Populated places in Shahr-e Babak County